Huang Xiaohui (born 1 July 1997) is a Chinese diver. At the 2014 Asian Games, she won the silver medal of the women's 10 m platform.

Early life
Born on 1997 in Guangxi, Huang was sent to the Nanning Sports Bureau swimming pool by her mother to learn how to swim when she was six years old. Not long after learning, a coach noticed Huang's talent and suggested to her mother to let Huang learn diving. In this way, Huang was recommended to the Guangxi diving team, where she started her diving career.

Sports career
In 2010, Huang was transferred to the People's Liberation Army Navy and in 2012, she became a member of the Chinese diving team. In 2013, she won the gold medal at the women's 10-meter diving platform at the 2013 National Diving Championship and in the same year, at the 12th National Games of China in Liaoning, she won the bronze medal in women's 10-meter diving platform. In 2014, she won gold medals in the mixed diving (with Chen Aisen) and the women's 10-meter single platform at the 19th FINA Diving World Cup in Shanghai.

On October 2, 2014, in the women's single 10-meter platform diving competition at the 2014 Asian Games in Incheon, she won the silver medal with 362.30 points. In October 2019, she won the gold medal in the women's double 3-meter springboard diving at the 2019 Military World Games in Wuhan. 

On September 14, 2021, at the 14th National Games of China in Shaanxi, Huang represented the Guangxi diving team. In the women's 3-meter springboard diving final, she won the bronze medal with 347.40 points.

Awards and honors
On March 24, 2021, Huang was awarded the title of First-Class Hero in Qingxiu District by Luo Wenyong, a member of the Standing Committee of the Party Committee of the Guangxi Military Region and director of the Political Work Bureau.

References

External links
FINA Profile

Living people
1997 births
Divers at the 2014 Asian Games
Chinese female divers
Asian Games medalists in diving
Asian Games silver medalists for China
Medalists at the 2014 Asian Games
People from Nanning
Sportspeople from Guangxi
21st-century Chinese women